KFKB (1490 AM) was a radio station  broadcasting a Classic Country format to the Forks, Washington, United States area. The station was owned by Forks Broadcasting. KFKB and KBDB-FM were the only commercial radio stations serving the West End of Clallam County, Washington. Their studios and transmitter were at 260 Cedar Avenue in Forks. The station's license was cancelled on May 21, 2019.

References

External links
FCC Station Search Details: DKFKB (Facility ID: 28209)
FCC History Cards for KFKB (covering 1966-1980 as KVAC)

RKZ
Radio stations disestablished in 2019
Defunct radio stations in the United States
2019 disestablishments in Washington (state)
1967 establishments in Washington (state)
Radio stations established in 1967
FKB